Soulac-sur-Mer, commonly known as Soulac (Solac), is a commune in the department of Gironde, administrative region of Nouvelle-Aquitaine (formerly Aquitaine), France. It's a seaside resort on the Côte d'Argent, on the peninsula of Médoc, 12 km from Royan and 86 km from Bordeaux.

Population

Twin towns — sister cities
Soulac is twinned with:

  Saarburg, Germany (1972)
  Ospedaletti, Liguria, Italy (1972)
  Burgo de Osma-Ciudad de Osma, Castile and León, Spain (1988)
  Castlerea, Connacht, Ireland (1990)

See also
Communes of Gironde

References

Communes of Gironde
World Heritage Sites in France
Populated coastal places in France